Peter Hintze (25 April 1950 – 26 November 2016) was a German politician of the Christian Democratic Union (CDU) who served as a member of the German Bundestag from 1990 until his death in 2016.

From 2013 until 2016, Hintze was one of the six Vice Presidents of the Bundestag. He had previously been federal chairman of the  Evangelical Working Group of the CDU/CSU from 1990 to 1992 and general secretary of the CDU from 1992 to 1998. He was also Vice President of the Centrist Democrat International.

Political career
Hintze served as a member of the German Bundestag from the 1990 federal election. Between 1990 and 1992, he chaired the Evangelical Working Group of the CDU/CSU.

In 1991/1992, Hintze briefly served as Parliamentary State Secretary at the Federal Ministry of Family Affairs, Senior Citizens, Women and Youth under minister Angela Merkel in the fourth cabinet of Chancellor Helmut Kohl.

During the national election campaign in 1994 Hintze was the driving force behind the Rote-Socken-Kampagne ("Red Socks Campaign"), a campaign which was directed against the left-wing PDS and the alleged possibility of a coalition between the PDS and the Social Democratic Party. It is believed that the Rote-Socken-Kampagne contributed to the electoral victory of the CDU and Chancellor Helmut Kohl.

In autumn 2005, the Bundestagswahl 2005 ended the Gerhard Schröder era; Angela Merkel became chancellor of a Union/SPD-cabinet.  From 2005 to 2013, Hintze served as Parliamentary State Secretary at the Federal Ministry for Economic Affairs and Technology under ministers Michael Glos (2005–2009); Karl-Theodor zu Guttenberg (2009); Rainer Brüderle (2009–2011); and Philipp Rösler (2011–2013) in the first and second cabinets of Chancellor Angela Merkel. Between 2007 and 2013, he was also the government’s Coordinator of Aerospace Policy.

From 2006, Hintze led the Bundestag group of CDU parliamentarians from North Rhine-Westphalia, the largest delegation within the CDU/CSU parliamentary group.

In the negotiations to form a coalition government of the Christian Democrats (CDU together with the Bavarian CSU) and the Free Democratic Party (FDP) following the 2009 federal elections, Hintze was part of the CDU/CSU delegation in the working group on foreign affairs, defense and development policy, led by Franz Josef Jung (CSU) and Werner Hoyer (FDP). Later, in the negotiations to form a Grand Coalition of Merkel's Christian Democrats and the SPD following the 2013 German elections, he was part of the CDU/CSU delegation in the working group on bank regulation and the Eurozone, led by Herbert Reul and Martin Schulz.

In his capacity as vice-president, he was a member of the parliament’s Council of Elders, which – among other duties – determines daily legislative agenda items and assigning committee chairpersons based on party representation.

In 2015, Hintze appointed Diana Kinnert as his parliamentary chief of staff, which made her the youngest chief of staff in the history of the Bundestag.

Hintze died from cancer on 26 November 2016. He was 66.

Recognition
 2009 – Officier de la Légion d’Honneur
 2012 – Robert Schuman Medal

References

External links

Peter Hintze, Vice-President of the Bundestag

1950 births
2016 deaths
German Protestants
Members of the Bundestag for North Rhine-Westphalia
Deaths from cancer in Germany
Members of the Bundestag 2013–2017
Members of the Bundestag 2009–2013
Members of the Bundestag 2005–2009
Members of the Bundestag 2002–2005
Members of the Bundestag 1998–2002
Members of the Bundestag 1994–1998
Members of the Bundestag for the Christian Democratic Union of Germany